The Knight's Cross of the Iron Cross and its variants were the highest awards in the military and paramilitary forces of Nazi Germany during World War II. This decoration was awarded for a wide range of reasons and across all ranks, from a senior commander for skilled leadership of his troops in battle to a low-ranking soldier for a single act of extreme gallantry. The Knight's Cross of the Iron Cross with Oak Leaves was introduced on 3 June 1940 to further distinguish those who had already received the Knight's Cross of the Iron Cross and who continued to show merit in combat bravery or military success. A total of 7 awards were made in 1940; 50 in 1941; 111 in 1942; 192 in 1943; 328 in 1944, and 194 in 1945, giving a total of 882 recipients—excluding the 8 foreign recipients of the award.

The number of 882 Oak Leaves recipients is based on the analysis and acceptance of the order commission of the Association of Knight's Cross Recipients (AKCR). However, author Veit Scherzer has challenged the validity of 27 of these listings. With the exception of Hermann Fegelein, all of the disputed recipients had received the award in 1945, when the deteriorating situation during the final days of World War II in Germany left a number of nominations incomplete and pending in various stages of the approval process. Fegelein received the Oak Leaves in 1942, but was sentenced to death by Adolf Hitler and executed by SS-Gruppenführer Johann Rattenhuber's Reichssicherheitsdienst (RSD) on 28 April 1945 after a court-martial led by SS-Brigadeführer and Generalmajor of the Waffen-SS Wilhelm Mohnke. The sentence was carried out the same day. The death sentence, according to German law, resulted in the loss of all orders and honorary signs.

Background
The Knight's Cross of the Iron Cross and its higher grades were based on four separate enactments. The first enactment,  of 1 September 1939 instituted the Iron Cross, the Knight's Cross of the Iron Cross and the Grand Cross of the Iron Cross. Article 2 of the enactment mandated that the award of a higher class be preceded by the award of all preceding classes. As the war progressed, some of the recipients of the Knight's Cross distinguished themselves further and a higher grade, the Oak Leaves to the Knight's Cross of the Iron Cross, was instituted. The Oak Leaves, as they were commonly referred to, were based on the enactment  of 3 June 1940. In 1941, two higher grades of the Knight's Cross were instituted. The enactment  of 28 September 1941 introduced the Knight's Cross of the Iron Cross with Oak Leaves and Swords and the Knight's Cross of the Iron Cross with Oak Leaves, Swords and Diamonds. At the end of 1944 the final grade, the Knight's Cross of the Iron Cross with Golden Oak Leaves, Swords, and Diamonds, based on the enactment  of 29 December 1944, became the final variant of the Knight's Cross authorized.

Recipients of 1945

The Oberkommando der Wehrmacht (Supreme Command of the Armed Forces) kept separate Knight's Cross lists for each of the three military branches—Heer (Army), Kriegsmarine (Navy), and Luftwaffe (Air Force)—and also for the Waffen-SS. Within each of these lists a unique sequential number was assigned to each recipient. The same numbering was applied to the higher grades of the Knight's Cross, one list per grade. Of the 194 awards made in 1945, 19 presentations were made posthumously. Heer members received 127 of the medals, 5 went to the Kriegsmarine, 37 to the Luftwaffe, and 25 to the Waffen-SS.

The Knight's Cross of the Iron Cross with Oak Leaves and Swords was awarded to one of the 194 Oak Leaves recipients of 1945. However, Viet Scherzer has disputed the listing of General of the Infantry Hermann Niehoff on the basis of poor record keeping associated with the deteriorating situation of Germany during the final days of World War II. The sequential numbers greater than 843 for the Knight's Cross of the Iron Cross with Oak Leaves and 143 for the Knight's Cross of the Iron Cross with Oak Leaves and Swords are unofficial and were assigned by the Association of Knight's Cross Recipients (AKCR) and are therefore denoted in parentheses. The recipients are ordered and numbered chronologically. The rank listed is the recipient's rank at the time the Knight's Cross with Oak Leaves was awarded.

Notes

References

Citations

Bibliography

External links

Lists of Knight's Cross of the Iron Cross recipients

de:Liste der Träger des Eichenlaubs zum Ritterkreuz des Eisernen Kreuzes